Tristan Trevor James Thompson (born March 13, 1991) is a Canadian-American professional basketball player who last played for the Chicago Bulls of the National Basketball Association (NBA). He won the 2016 NBA Finals with the Cleveland Cavaliers and has also played in the NBA for the Boston Celtics, Sacramento Kings, and Indiana Pacers.

Thompson played one season of college basketball for the Texas Longhorns before being drafted fourth overall by the Cavaliers in the 2011 NBA draft. He has also played for the Canadian national team. Thompson won an NBA championship with the Cavaliers in 2016.

High school career
Born in Brampton, Thompson attended St. Marguerite d'Youville Secondary School in Brampton for 9th grade. After driving from Brampton twice to visit a prep school in the United States, Thompson decided to attend Saint Benedict's Preparatory School in Newark, New Jersey for his sophomore year along with fellow University of Texas at Austin commit Myck Kabongo. He cited the increase in exposure and skill level as his reason for transferring.

Thompson spent his sophomore and half his junior year at St. Benedict's, making an immediate impact and showing flashes of brilliance. In his short time there, he shot through the ranks to super-stardom, becoming the top recruit in the nation entering his junior season. The nation's top basketball programs heavily sought Thompson, who made the first verbal commitment of the class of 2010 to Rick Barnes and the Texas Longhorns.

Twenty-one games into his junior year, the relationship between Thompson and then-St. Benedict's coach Dan Hurley hit a rough patch. Hurley's in-your-face, no-holds-barred coaching style took a toll on the young star. During a game against then-top-ranked Mater Dei, Hurley confronted Thompson during a time out. A heated debate ensued, and Thompson was sent off the court and later removed from the team. Over the next few days he made it known that he was planning to leave, resulting in a barrage of calls from top prep schools throughout North America trying to acquire his services. The next week he transferred to Findlay Prep with his close friend and AAU teammate Cory Joseph.

Thompson joined Findlay on the back end of their schedule, making an immediate impact on the team and thriving under Findlay coach Michael Peck's system and coaching style. Thompson solidified his top recruit status and helped lead Findlay to their first National Championship. He continued to round and polish his skills his senior year in preparation for college and held fast to his commitment to the University of Texas, officially signing his letter of intent on November 11, 2009. Thompson then led his team to another National Championship at the ESPN National High School Invitational. After their senior year, Thompson and Joseph both committed to Texas and were the fourth and fifth Canadians to be named McDonald's All-Americans, after Bill Wennington (1981), Barry Bekkedam (1986) and Olu Famutimi (2003). Thompson was also named a Jordan Brand Classic All-American.

College career
Thompson averaged 13.1 points and 7.8 rebounds per game for the Texas Longhorns in 2010–11 as he won the team's Most Valuable Player award, as voted on by his teammates. Nationally, Thompson was one of five finalists for the Wayman Tisdale Award, an honor given to the National Freshman of the Year by the U.S. Basketball Writers Association. Thompson won the Big 12 Freshman of the Year honours as well as first-team NABC All-District 8 and USBWA All-District VII honours. He led the team in rebounding, blocked shots (86), double-doubles (10) and field goal percentage (.546) while ranking second in scoring. He helped Texas conclude the 2010–11 season with a 28–8 record and advanced to the NCAA Tournament Round of 32. The Longhorns finished No. 8 in the final AP poll.

Thompson told media after the NCAA tournament that he planned to return to Texas for his sophomore season but changed his mind. On April 21, 2011, he declared for the NBA draft, forgoing his last three years of college eligibility.

Professional career

Cleveland Cavaliers (2011–2020)

2011–12 season: Rookie season
On June 23, 2011, Thompson was drafted fourth overall in the 2011 NBA draft by the Cleveland Cavaliers. At the time, he was the highest drafted Canadian-born player in NBA history, that was until Anthony Bennett and Andrew Wiggins were selected as the first overall pick in 2013 and 2014, respectively. Thompson continued to make history, drafted alongside Joseph, who was picked 29th by the San Antonio Spurs, only the second occasion in NBA history to that date that two Canadians were selected in the first round of the same draft, the first being in 1983 when Leo Rautins and Stewart Granger were selected 17th and 25th respectively. The 2011 draft was also the first time three Texas Longhorn basketball players went in the first round of a draft, when Thompson's former collegiate teammate Jordan Hamilton went 26th overall to the Dallas Mavericks.

During the 2011 NBA lockout, Thompson attended classes at the University of Texas to finish his college degree. Thompson signed his rookie contract with the Cavaliers on December 9, 2011, before the start of training camp. Thompson made his professional debut against his hometown Toronto Raptors on December 26, 2011. In 17 minutes off the bench, Thompson scored 12 points and pulled in 5 rebounds. Both Thompson and teammate Kyrie Irving were later named to the 2012 Rising Stars Challenge. However, Thompson was selected to play for Team Shaq, while Irving was selected by Team Chuck.

Thompson finished the season with averages of 8.2 points and 6.5 rebounds in 60 games as he earned NBA All-Rookie Second Team honors, becoming the first Canadian to ever earn All-Rookie team honors in the NBA.

2012–13 season
In the 2012–13 season, Thompson worked on avoiding getting his own shots blocked, and switched his shooting hand from left to right. For most of the season, almost 17%, or one out of six, of his shots were blocked, threatening former NBA player Danny Fortson's 16.7% rate in 1997–98. Thompson dropped to around 15% by season's end, which was only reached by three other players before the season. He went on to average 3.7 offensive rebounds per game, which ranked fifth in the NBA and first among second year players, and set the Cavaliers franchise record for most offensive rebounds in a single season with 306 (second in the NBA), surpassing Zydrunas Ilgauskas' 299 offensive rebounds in the 2004–05 season. He also recorded a team-high 31 double-doubles on the season, becoming just the ninth player in franchise history to total at least 30 double-doubles in a single season. He started all 82 games in 2012–13 as he averaged 11.7 points on .488 shooting, 9.4 rebounds and 0.9 blocks in 31.3 minutes per game.

2013–14 season
In the 2013 off-season, Thompson decided to switch his shooting hand to his right instead of his left. Despite the change, he had an almost identical season for the Cavaliers in 2013–14, as he started all 82 games while averaging 11.7 points and 9.2 rebounds in 31.6 minutes per game. He tied for fifth in the Eastern Conference with a team-leading and career-best 36 double-doubles.

2014–15 season
During the 2014 off-season, the Cavaliers acquired All-Star forwards LeBron James and Kevin Love. Thompson came off the bench for most of the season, providing energy and solidifying his place as one of the best offensive rebounders in the league, averaging 8.5 points and 8 rebounds per game. He played in all 82 games and started 15. The Cavaliers finished with a 53–29 record and made the playoffs for the first time since 2010. Early in the first round, Kevin Love dislocated his shoulder and was ruled out for the rest of the post-season. Thompson became the starter after Love's injury and helped the Cavaliers reach the 2015 NBA Finals. The Cavaliers faced the Golden State Warriors, and lost the series in six games. During the playoffs, Thompson emerged as one of the NBA's best rebounders, especially on the offensive glass. He became a restricted free agent after the season.

2015–16 season: Championship season
On October 22, 2015, Thompson re-signed with the Cavaliers on a five-year, $82 million contract, ending a four-month contract stalemate that caused Thompson to miss training camp, the preseason, and the FIBA Americas Championship. Throughout the 2015–16 season, Thompson shared the starting center role with Timofey Mozgov. On January 25, 2016, he recorded a season-high 19 points and 12 rebounds in a 114–107 win over the Minnesota Timberwolves. On March 26, in a win over the New York Knicks, Thompson tied Jim Chones' franchise record by appearing in his 361st consecutive game for the Cavaliers. He broke that record three days later, appearing in his 362nd consecutive game in a loss to the Houston Rockets. Thompson helped the Cavaliers reach the NBA Finals for the second consecutive season. There they made NBA history by coming back from a 3–1 deficit against the Golden State Warriors to win the series in seven games, ending a 52-year championship drought in Cleveland.

2016–17 season
On December 26, 2016, in a loss to the Detroit Pistons, Thompson became the first player in franchise history to play in 400 consecutive regular-season games. On April 5, 2017, Thompson missed the Cavaliers' game against the Boston Celtics with a sprained right thumb. Thompson's absence ended his streak of consecutive games played at 447—the longest in team history and the longest active streak in the league at the time. He missed four games with the injury before returning to action in Cleveland's regular-season finale on April 12 against the Toronto Raptors. Thompson helped the Cavaliers go 12–1 over the first three rounds of the playoffs to reach the NBA Finals for a third straight season. There the Cavaliers matched-up with the Golden State Warriors, but lost the series in five games.

2017–18 season
On November 2, 2017, Thompson was ruled out for three to four weeks with a left calf strain that he suffered the previous night against the Indiana Pacers. On December 12, 2017, he played in his first game since November 1; he went scoreless and did not have a rebound in 6 minutes against the Atlanta Hawks. On February 25, 2018, he had a season-high 13 rebounds in 23 minutes in a 110–94 loss to the San Antonio Spurs. In Game 7 of the Cavaliers' first-round playoff series against the Pacers, Thompson, who played just 24 minutes in the first six games, made a rare start and had 15 points and 10 rebounds in a 105–101 win. The Cavaliers made it to the 2018 NBA Finals, where they were swept by the Golden State Warriors.

2018–19 season

To begin the season for the 6–21 Cavaliers, Thompson was averaging career highs in points (12.0) and rebounds (11.6) through 27 games. However, on December 11, he was ruled out for two to four weeks with a left foot sprain. He returned to action on January 2 against the Miami Heat after missing 10 games. On March 20, against the Milwaukee Bucks, Thompson returned after missing 26 games with a sore left foot.

2019–20 season
On January 9, 2020, Thompson recorded a double-double with a career-high 35 points, 14 rebounds, three assists, three blocks and a steal in an 115–112 overtime win over the Detroit Pistons.

Boston Celtics (2020–2021)
On November 30, 2020, Thompson signed a two-year, $19 million contract with the Boston Celtics.

Sacramento Kings (2021–2022)
On August 7, 2021, Thompson was traded to the Sacramento Kings in a three-team trade involving the Atlanta Hawks.

Indiana Pacers (2022)
On February 8, 2022, Thompson, Tyrese Haliburton, and Buddy Hield were traded to the Indiana Pacers in exchange for Justin Holiday, Jeremy Lamb, Domantas Sabonis, and a 2023 second-round pick. On February 16, Thompson recorded a season-high 17 points along with 6 rebounds and a block in a win over the Washington Wizards. On February 17, after playing four games, the Pacers reached a mutual contract buyout agreement with Thompson.

Chicago Bulls (2022)
On February 19, 2022, Thompson signed with the Chicago Bulls.

Career statistics

NBA

Regular season

|-
| style="text-align:left;"|
| style="text-align:left;"|Cleveland
| 60 || 25 || 23.7 || .439 || .000 || .552 || 6.5 || .5 || .5 || 1.0 || 8.2
|-
| style="text-align:left;"|
| style="text-align:left;"|Cleveland
| style="background:#cfecec;"|  82* || 82 || 31.3 || .488 || .000 || .608 || 9.4 || 1.3 || .7 || .9 || 11.7
|-
| style="text-align:left;"|
| style="text-align:left;"|Cleveland
| 82 || 82 || 31.6 || .477 || .000 || .693 || 9.2 || .9 || .5 || .4 || 11.7
|-
| style="text-align:left;"|
| style="text-align:left;"|Cleveland
| 82 || 15 || 26.8 || .547 ||  || .641 || 8.0 || .5 || .4 || .7 || 8.5
|-
| style="text-align:left; background:#afe6ba;"|†
| style="text-align:left;"|Cleveland
| style="background:#cfecec;"|  82* || 34 || 27.7 || .588 ||  || .616 || 9.0 || .8 || .5 || .6 || 7.9
|-
| style="text-align:left;"|
| style="text-align:left;"|Cleveland
| 78 || 78 || 29.9 || .600 || .000 || .498 || 9.2 || 1.0 || .5 || 1.1 || 8.1
|-
| style="text-align:left;"|
| style="text-align:left;"|Cleveland
| 53 || 22 || 20.2 || .562 ||  || .544 || 6.6 || .6 || .3 || .3 ||5.8
|-
| style="text-align:left;"|
| style="text-align:left;"|Cleveland
| 43 || 40 || 27.9 || .529 ||  || .642 || 10.2 || 2.0 || .7 || .4 || 10.9
|-
| style="text-align:left;"|
| style="text-align:left;"|Cleveland
| 57 || 51 || 30.2 || .512 || .391 || .615 || 10.1 || 2.1 || .6 || .9 || 12.0
|-
| style="text-align:left;"|
| style="text-align:left;"|Boston
| 54 || 43 || 23.8 || .518 || .000 || .592 || 8.1 || 1.2 || .4 || .6 || 7.6
|-
| style="text-align:left;" rowspan=3|
| style="text-align:left;"|Sacramento
| 30 || 3 || 15.2 || .503 || 1.000 || .533 || 5.4 || .6 || .4 || .4 || 6.2
|-
| style="text-align:left;"|Indiana
| 4 || 0 || 16.4 || .542 ||  || .375 || 4.5 || .5 || .0 || .5 || 7.3
|-
| style="text-align:left;"|Chicago
| 23 || 3 || 16.3 || .565 || .000 || .542 || 4.7 || .6 || .5 || .3 || 5.7
|- class="sortbottom"
| style="text-align:center;" colspan="2"|Career
| 730 || 478 || 26.8 || .519 || .263 || .605 || 8.4 || 1.0 || .5 || .7 || 9.0

Playoffs

|-
| style="text-align:left;"|2015
| style="text-align:left;"|Cleveland
| 20 || 15 || 36.4 || .558 ||  || .585 || 10.8 || .5 || .3 || 1.2 || 9.6
|-
| style="text-align:left; background:#afe6ba;"|2016†
| style="text-align:left;"|Cleveland
| 21 || 21 || 29.6 || .527 ||  || .575 || 9.0 || .7 || .4 || .9 || 6.7
|-
| style="text-align:left;"|2017
| style="text-align:left;"|Cleveland
| 18 || 18 || 31.2 || .587 ||  || .667 || 8.3 || 1.4 || .5 || .7 || 8.2
|-
| style="text-align:left;"|2018
| style="text-align:left;"|Cleveland
| 19 || 11 || 21.9 || .590 || .000 ||  .741 || 5.9 || .6 || .1 || .4 || 6.2
|-
| style="text-align:left;"|2021
| style="text-align:left;"|Boston
| 5 || 5 || 26.4 || .588 || .000 || .706 || 9.8 || 1.0 || .8 || 1.2 || 10.4
|-
| style="text-align:left;"|2022
| style="text-align:left;"|Chicago
| 5 || 0 || 7.6 || .400 || .000 || .000 || 1.6 || .4 || .2 || .0 || .8
|- class="sortbottom"
| style="text-align:center;" colspan="2"|Career
| 88 || 70 || 28.4 || .564 || .000 || .625 || 8.2 || .8 || .3 || .8 || 7.4

College

|-
| style="text-align:left;"|2010–11
| style="text-align:left;"|Texas
| 36 || 34 || 30.7 || .546 || .000 || .487 || 7.8 || 1.3 || .9 || 2.4 || 13.1

International career
Thompson represented his country and Canada Basketball at the FIBA Americas Under-18 Championship in 2008, where Canada won the bronze medal, placing behind Argentina and the United States. Thompson once again competed for Canada at the 2009 FIBA Under-19 World Championship in Auckland, New Zealand.

At the 2013 FIBA Americas Championship, Thompson averaged 11.6 points and 10.0 rebounds per game. He led the 2016 FIBA World Olympic Qualifying Tournament with 33 rebounds, and in 2018, he played one game in a qualifying tournament for the 2019 FIBA World Cup.

Awards
 2016 NBA champion
 2012 NBA All-Rookie Second Team 
 2011 NCAA Men's Basketball All-Americans: Associated Press Honorable Mention
 2011 United States Basketball Writers Association (USBWA) All-District VII Team
 2011 Wayman Tisdale Award (USBWA National Freshman of the Year)
 2011 USBWA Freshman All-America Team
 2011 All-Big 12 Second Team
 2011 Big 12 All-Defensive Team
 2011 Big 12 Freshman of the Year
 2011 Big 12 All-Freshman Team

Personal life
Thompson is the eldest of four sons of Jamaican parents. His younger brother played high school basketball for Wesley Christian High School in Allen, Kentucky, where he was a highly rated prospect. In 2013, Thompson founded the Amari Thompson Fund, which works closely with Epilepsy Toronto to raise funds and awareness to support those affected by epilepsy. Thompson's youngest brother Amari has the neurological disorder and experiences seizures almost daily due to his condition.

In 2020, Thompson acquired American citizenship.

Relationships 
In December 2016, Thompson's ex-girlfriend gave birth to his first child, a son. He was ordered to pay $40,000/month in child support and $200,000 in backend payments.

Thompson began dating Khloé Kardashian in 2016, with whom he allegedly cheated on ex-girlfriend Jordan Craig, according to court documents. On April 12, 2018, Khloé gave birth to their daughter, True. Thompson was found to have been unfaithful to Kardashian during the pregnancy. In February 2019, they split. In the summer of 2020, Thompson and Kardashian resumed their relationship after quarantining together during the COVID-19 pandemic. In June 2021, they announced that they had split again.

In December 2021, it was reported that a woman had filed a paternity lawsuit against Thompson in Los Angeles in June 2021, as a result of an affair he had while dating Khloé Kardashian. Thompson confirmed the following month that he was the father of the woman's son and issued an apology to Kardashian.

In July 2022, it was confirmed that Thompson and Kardashian were expecting their second child together, via surrogacy. Their son was born on July 28, 2022.

See also

 List of Canadians in the National Basketball Association

Notes

References

External links

 DraftExpress profile
 Texas Longhorns bio
 

1991 births
Living people
Basketball players from Toronto
Black Canadian basketball players
Boston Celtics players
Canadian emigrants to the United States
Canadian expatriate basketball people in the United States
Canadian men's basketball players
Canadian people of Jamaican descent
Centers (basketball)
Chicago Bulls players
Cleveland Cavaliers draft picks
Cleveland Cavaliers players
Findlay Prep alumni
Indiana Pacers players
Kardashian family
McDonald's High School All-Americans
National Basketball Association players from Canada
Parade High School All-Americans (boys' basketball)
People with acquired American citizenship
Power forwards (basketball)
Sacramento Kings players
Sportspeople from Brampton
Texas Longhorns men's basketball players